
Gmina Giżycko is a rural gmina (administrative district) in Giżycko County, Warmian-Masurian Voivodeship, in northern Poland. Its seat is the town of Giżycko, although the town is not part of the territory of the gmina.

Neighbouring gminas
Gmina Giżycko is bordered by the town of Giżycko and by the gminas of Kętrzyn, Kruklanki, Miłki, Pozezdrze, Ryn, Węgorzewo and Wydminy.

Villages
The gmina contains the following villages having the status of sołectwo: Antonowo, Bogacko, Bogaczewo, Bystry, Doba, Gajewo, Grajwo, Guty, Kąp, Kamionki, Kożuchy Wielkie, Kruklin, Pieczonki, Pierkunowo, Sołdany, Spytkowo, Sterławki Małe, Sulimy, Szczybały Giżyckie, Świdry, Upałty, Upałty Małe, Wilkasy, Wilkaski, Wronka and Wrony.

There are also 12 villages without sołectwo status: Wola Bogaczkowska, Dziewiszewo, Fuleda, Kożuchy Małe, Nowe Sołdany, Zielony Gaj, Sterławki Średnie, Gorazdowo, Strzelce, Kalinowo, Piękna Góra and Wrony Nowe.

References
Polish official population figures 2006

Gizycko
Giżycko County